Little Bow Lake Reservoir is a reservoir in Alberta. It is popular in the area as a swimming hole and fishing spot.

History
The land that is now Little Bow Lake Reservoir used to be a depression in a flat, grassy prairie. The area was used by the Blackfoot tribe as a hunting ground for buffalo. The Canadian government filled the depression with water in 1920 with water from the Little Bow River.

Lakes of Alberta
Vulcan County
1920 establishments in Alberta